The 2007–08 Swiss Super League was the 111th season of top-tier football in Switzerland. The competition is officially named AXPO Super League due to sponsoring purposes. It began on 18 July 2007 and has ended on 10 May 2008.

League table

Results
Teams play each other four times in this league. In the first half of the season each team played every other team twice (home and away) and then do the same in the second half of the season.

First half of season

Second half of season

Relegation play-offs 
FC St. Gallen as 9th-placed team of the Super League were played a two-legged play-off against Challenge League runners-up AC Bellinzona.

Bellinzona won 4–3 on aggregate. St. Gallen are relegated to the Swiss Challenge League.

Top goalscorers

Awards
Super League Player of the Year: Hakan Yakin (BSC Young Boys)
Goal of the Year: Mauro Lustrinelli (FC Lucerne, scored against FC Basel)
Coach of the Year: Christian Gross (FC Basel)
Youngster of the Year: Eren Derdiyok (FC Basel)
Fair Play Trophy: FC Aarau

External links
 Super league website 
 Soccerway - Super League

Swiss Super League seasons
Swiss
1